Pseudosynagelides is a spider genus of the jumping spider family, Salticidae.

The genera Agorius and Synagelides (and perhaps Pseudosynagelides) are separated as a genus group, sometimes called subfamily Agoriinae but more recently downranked to tribe Agoriini of the Salticoida clade in subfamily Salticinae.

Name
The genus name is combined of Greek pseudo "false" and the salticid genus name Synagelides.

Species
 Pseudosynagelides australensis Zabka, 1991 – Queensland
 Pseudosynagelides bunya Zabka, 1991 – Queensland
 Pseudosynagelides elae Zabka, 1991 – Queensland
 Pseudosynagelides monteithi Zabka, 1991 – Queensland
 Pseudosynagelides raveni Zabka, 1991 – Queensland, New South Wales
 Pseudosynagelides yorkensis Zabka, 1991 – Queensland

References

Salticidae
Spiders of Australia
Fauna of Queensland
Salticidae genera